Todd Perry (born November 28, 1970 in Elizabethtown, Kentucky) is a former American football guard in the National Football League. He was drafted by the Chicago Bears in the fourth round of the 1993 NFL Draft. He played college football at Kentucky (1989–92). He played high school football at North Hardin High School and was Inducted into the North Hardin Trojan Athletic Hall of Fame in 2007.

Perry played eight seasons with the Bears and three with the Miami Dolphins.

References

1970 births
Living people
American football offensive guards
Kentucky Wildcats football players
Chicago Bears players
Miami Dolphins players
Players of American football from Kentucky
Brian Piccolo Award winners